Myodocarpus is a genus of plants in the family Myodocarpaceae. It is endemic to New Caledonia. The only other genus of the family is Delarbrea.

List of species
 Myodocarpus crassifolius
 Myodocarpus fraxinifolius
 Myodocarpus gracilis
 Myodocarpus involucratus
 Myodocarpus lanceolatus
 Myodocarpus pinnatus
 Myodocarpus simplicifolius
 Myodocarpus vieillardii

References

 
Apiales genera
Endemic flora of New Caledonia
Taxonomy articles created by Polbot
Taxa named by Adolphe-Théodore Brongniart
Taxa named by Jean Antoine Arthur Gris